Bussa's rebellion (14–16 April 1816) was the largest slave revolt in Barbadian history. The rebellion takes its name from the African-born slave, Bussa, who led the rebellion. The rebellion, which was eventually defeated by the colonial militia, was the first of three mass slave rebellions in the British West Indies that shook public faith in slavery in the years leading up to the abolition of slavery in the British Empire and emancipation of former slaves. It was followed by the Demerara rebellion of 1823 and by the Baptist War in Jamaica in 1831–1832; these are often referred to as the "late slave rebellions".

Bussa
Bussa was born a free man in West Africa of possible Igbo descent and was captured by African merchants, sold to European slave traders and transported to Barbados in the late 18th century as a slave, where under the Barbados Slave Code slavery had been legal since 1661. Not much is known about him and there are no earlier records of him, and virtually no biographical information about Bussa is available. Records show a slave named "Bussa" worked as a ranger (a head officer among the slaves) on "Bayley's Plantation" in the parish of Saint Philip around the time of the rebellion. This position would have given Bussa more freedom of movement than the average slave and would have made it easier for him to plan and coordinate the rebellion.

Revolt

The revolts arose at a time when the British Parliament was working on schemes to ameliorate the conditions of slaves in the Caribbean. Preparation for this rebellion began soon after the House of Assembly discussed and rejected the Imperial Registry Bill in November 1815, which would have registered West Indian slaves. Historians believe that slaves interpreted some of the parliamentary proposals as preparatory to emancipation, and took action when emancipation did not take place.

Among Bussa's collaborators were Joseph Pitt Washington Franklin (a free man), John and Nanny Grigg, a senior domestic slave, and Jackey on Simmons' Plantation, as well as other slaves, drivers and artisans. Jackey was a Creole driver who was an important figure. The planning was undertaken at a number of sugar estates, including Bailey's plantation, where it began.  By February 1816, Bussa was an African driver, one of the few in his position. He and his collaborators decided to start the revolt on 14 April, Easter Sunday.

Bussa, King Wiltshire, Dick Bailey and Johnny led the slaves into battle at Bailey's Plantation on Tuesday, 16 April. He commanded some 400 rebels, men and women, most of whom were believed to be Creole, born in the islands.  He was killed in battle, his forces continued the fight until they were defeated by superior firepower of the colonial militia. The rebellion failed but its influence was significant to the future of Barbados.

Legacy
 Bussa remains a popular figure in Barbados.
 In 1985, 169 years after his rebellion, the Emancipation Statue, created by Karl Broodhagen, was unveiled in Haggatt Hall, in the parish of St Michael. Many Barbadians attributed the statue to Bussa and nicknamed it "Bussa's Statue".
 1998, the Parliament of Barbados named Bussa as one of the eleven National Heroes of Barbados.

References

Further reading
 Beckles, Hilary.  "A History of Barbados: From Amerindian Settlement to Caribbean Single Market".  Cambridge University Press, 2007.
 Beckles, Hilary.  Black Rebellion in Barbados.  Bridgetown, Barbados: Antilles Publications, 1984. [detailed account of the rebellion]
 Craton, Michael. Testing the Chains: Resistance to Slavery in the British West Indies, Ithaca, N.Y.: Cornell University Press, 1982. [detailed account of the rebellion]
 Rodriguez, Junius P., ed. Encyclopedia of Slave Resistance and Rebellion. Westport, CT: Greenwood, 2006.

External links 
 Bussa profile, Itzcaribbean
 Bussa's Rebellion: How and Why did the Enslaved Africans of Barbados rebel in 1816, National Archives (UK)

Afro-Caribbean history
Conflicts in 1816
19th-century rebellions
Wars involving Barbados
Abolitionism in Barbados
1816 in Barbados
National Heroes of Barbados
Slave rebellions in North America
April 1816 events
Slavery in Barbados